Jordi Bonet i Godó, known professionally as Jordi Bonet  (7 May 1932 – 25 December 1979), was a Spanish-born Canadian painter, ceramist, muralist, and sculptor who worked principally in Quebec.

Life and work
Born in Barcelona, Spain of Catalan origin, he lost his right arm at the age of 9. His childhood would be marked by the Spanish Civil War. He studied art in Barcelona. He began working in paint and ceramic before expanding his focus to include metal and concrete reliefs.

He emigrated to Canada in 1954, establishing himself in Quebec, where he continued his studies. After briefly returning to Spain, he established an atelier in Mont-Saint-Hilaire in 1960. Over the next 20 years, he created more than 100 works in Quebec and abroad, and associated with major art figures such as Salvador Dalí.

In 1964, he was commissioned by the Government of Sierra Leone to deliver the mural which can still be seen at the front of the Bank of Sierra Leone building, in the capital, Freetown. His signature is situated at the bottom right-hand of the mural, with the words "Jordi Bonet '64"

His relief in the Grand Théâtre de Québec created a scandal in 1971 because of the line "Vous êtes pas écœurés de mourir bande de caves? C'est assez !" ("Aren't you sick of dying, you gang of idiots? Enough!") incorporated into it, a quotation from the poet Claude Péloquin. 
Among his other major works are the relief Citius, Altius, Fortius in the Montreal Metro station Pie-IX; 
Hommage à Gaudí, a cycle of wall sculptures in Place des Arts in Montreal; the Halifax Explosion Memorial Sculpture; and a set of stained-glass windows and sculptures in Our Lady of the Skies Chapel at John F. Kennedy International Airport in New York City. He was particularly interested in sacred works, creating artworks and liturgical objects for churches and convents in Quebec, Ontario, and elsewhere. Galerie L'Art français exhibited his works from the 1950s.

He was one of Quebec's major artists when he died of leukemia at the age of 47.

Honours 
 Royal Canadian Academy of Arts

Work

See also
 List of Canadian artists
 Jordi-Bonet Bridge

References

External links
 Official website
 Jordi Bonet (MetroDeMontréal.com)

1932 births
1979 deaths
Sculptors from Quebec
Sculptors from Catalonia
Canadian ceramists
Canadian muralists
Montreal Metro artists
Members of the Royal Canadian Academy of Arts
Canadian amputees
Spanish emigrants to Canada
Deaths from leukemia
Deaths from cancer in Quebec
20th-century Canadian sculptors
20th-century Canadian painters
Canadian male painters
20th-century ceramists
20th-century Canadian male artists